Deans Grange Cemetery (also spelled Deansgrange) is situated in the suburban area of Deansgrange in the Dún Laoghaire–Rathdown part of the former County Dublin, Ireland. Since it first opened in 1865, over 150,000 people have been buried there. It is, together with Glasnevin and Mount Jerome, one of the largest cemeteries in the Dublin area, occupying .

History

The Burial Act of 1855 resulted in the closure of many of the older churchyards in Dublin and its environs due to overcrowding. This drove the need to find new lands for cemeteries.

The initial cemetery consisted of just  bought by the Rathdown Union from Rev. John Beatty. The price agreed was £200 which Rev. Beatty set as being equivalent to twenty years rent. A committee was formed to run the new cemetery and on 20 November 1861 Sir George Hobson, chairman of the Guardians of the Rural Districts of the Union, signed the deeds establishing the new cemetery. The new committee set about appointing Matthew Betham as the chairman and Joseph Cope as the office clerk of administrative duties and the building of the new cemetery.

The cemetery was laid out with just two sections, North for Catholic and South for Protestant religions as well as separate chapels for both. It also consisted of a Gate Lodge (Registrar's house) and yew trees lining the main walkways. The buildings were constructed by Matthew Gahan, whose name can be seen on the metal doors to the vaults under each chapel.

The first burial in the new cemetery was on 28 January 1865, when Anastasia Carey was buried near the Catholic chapel. There were four grave types to be chosen by the families.
1st Class located adjacent to the main pathways and considered the most prominent and most expensive.
2nd Class located adjacent to the smaller pathways and expensive.
3rd Class surrounded by other plots where payment was required within five years. Failure to pay resulted in the grave reverting to the Burial Board for reuse.
4th Class on loan and reverted to the Burial Board for reuse after a number of years.

Since the opening of the cemetery two sections were added, South West and West, and the North section was extended. From the 1930s more land was bought and new sections were created and named after different saints bringing the total number of sections to 16.

In 1984 a sister cemetery was opened south of Shankill village called Shanganagh Cemetery and occupying . By the late 1980s, the cemetery was running out of space and it was decided to stop selling new grave spaces. However, recent proposals around 2008 will see a small number of improvements and spaces made available.

The gate lodge was lived in by the registrar until the late 1990s when it was vacated.

Today Dean's Grange Cemetery is administered by Dún Laoghaire-Rathdown County Council.

Notable burials

Interred in the cemetery are people from notable events in local and Irish history.
 The 15 local men of the Kingstown Lifeboat Disaster in 1895 who crewed a rescue boat involved in an attempt to rescue the Palme.
 The Angels plot used from 1905 to 1989 to bury children. It is estimated that 750 children are buried here. Cemetery staff renovated the plot around 2008.
 During the 1916 Easter Rising, the cemetery saw the burial of about 50 people connected to the rising. They were either innocent civilian victims, members of the Irish Volunteers and the Irish Citizen Army, or British Army soldiers. There is a plot with 6 people buried and the rest are buried by their respective families.
 RMS Leinster was torpedoed by a German submarine  from Dún Laoghaire in 1918. Eleven known victims are buried in the cemetery.

United Kingdom armed services casualties of the 1916 rising and the Leinster sinking are among the 75 Commonwealth service personnel of World War I who are buried in this cemetery, as are 27 from World War II, whose graves are registered and maintained by the Commonwealth War Graves Commission.

Also interred at Deans Grange:
Todd Andrews (1901–1985), Irish Republican political and military activist, later civil servant
Mona Baptiste (1928-1993), singer
Louie Bennett (1870–1956), suffragette, trade unionist, journalist and writer 
Richard Irvine Best (1872–1959), Celtic scholar
Jasper Brett (1895–1917), Irish rugby international and Royal Dublin Fusiliers officer
Francis Browning (1868–1916), cricketer and President of the Irish Rugby Football Union
Joseph Campbell (1879–1944), poet
Kathleen Clarke (1878–1972), Irish republican Sinn Féin and Fianna Fáil TD and Senator and widow of the Irish revolutionary Thomas J. Clarke
John A. Costello (1891–1976), Taoiseach and Fine Gael politician.
Rickard Deasy (1812–1883), lawyer and judge; Member of Parliament for Cork County
Denis Devlin (1908–1959), poet
John Boyd Dunlop (1840–1921), Scottish inventor of the pneumatic tyre
Reginald Dunne (died 1922), Irish republican 
Frank Fahy (1880–1953), Teachta Dála (TD) and Ceann Comhairle (speaker), buried alongside his wife Anna Fahy
Barry Fitzgerald (1888–1961), actor
Alice Stopford Green (1847–1929), historian 
John Edward Healy (1872–1934), longest serving editor of the Irish Times (1907–34)
Augustine Henry (1857–1930), botanist
Seosamh Laoide (1865–1939), scholar and a major figure in Conradh na Gaeilge.
Seán Lemass (1899–1971), Taoiseach and Fianna Fáil politician
Kathleen Lynn (1874–1955), suffragette, member of the Irish Citizen Army and TD for the Dublin County constituency
Donagh MacDonagh (1912–1968), writer and judge
John McCormack (1884–1945), tenor; papal count
F. J. McCormick (1889–1947), actor
Joseph McGrath (1887–1966), politician and a founder of the Irish Hospitals' Sweepstake
 Anew McMaster (1891-1962), actor-manager
Brinsley MacNamara (1890–1963), author of The Valley of the Squinting Windows
John D. J. Moore (1910–1988), US Ambassador to Ireland (1969–75), interred next to his wife and a daughter
Dermot Morgan (1952–1998), comedian and actor
Delia Murphy (1902–1971), singer and collector of Irish ballads
John Gardiner Nutting (1852–1918), baronet of St. Helen's, Booterstown
Séamas Ó Maoileoin (1893-1959), Irish War of Independence veteran
Brian Ó Nualláin (literary name Flann O'Brien; 1911–1966), novelist
Leon Ó Broin (1902–1990), writer 
Frank O'Connor (1903–1966), writer, pseudonym of Michael O'Donovan
Milo O'Shea (1926–2013), actor
Pádraig Ó Siochfhradha (1883–1964), writer and teacher of Gaeilge
Joseph O'Sullivan (died 1922), Irish republican
John Howard Parnell (1846–1923), politician and older brother to Charles Stewart Parnell
John Talbot Power, 3rd Baronet of Edermine (1845–1901) of Leopardstown Park; grandson of the founder of Power's Distillery, Dublin
Noel Purcell (1900–1985), actor
Senator William Quirke (1896–1955), Fianna Fáil politician, businessman and IRA leader in Tipperary (Irish War of Independence, Irish Civil War)
Arthur Shields (1896–1970), actor Brother of Barry Fitzgerald
Elizabeth Mary Troy (1914–2011), obstetrician
Ernest Walton (1903–1995), physicist and Nobel Laureate
Joseph Edward Woodall (1896–1962), winner of the Victoria Cross
Michael "Sonny" Murphy, from Kilnaboy, Co. Clare who represented Ireland at the 1932 Los Angeles Olympic games. 

There are also many members of Roman Catholic religious orders buried here such as the Congregation of Christian Brothers, Daughters of the Cross, Holy Ghost Fathers, Irish Vincentians, the Little Sisters of the Assumption and the Missionaries of the Sacred Heart.

References

External links
Dublin Cemeteries
Dún Laoghaire-Rathdown County Council website
Burial records for Deans Grange and Shanganagh cemeteries

 
Cemeteries in Dún Laoghaire–Rathdown
1861 establishments in Ireland